Jon Beekhuis (born March 31, 1960) is an American former race car driver. Beekhuis was born in Zurich, Switzerland while his American father was studying at ETH Zurich, and grew up in California. The 1988 ARS (Indy Lights) champion, Beekhuis drove in 14 CART races from 1989 to 1992. He, however, never drove in the Indianapolis 500. His best finish was an 8th at the 1990 Michigan 500. He later became a pit reporter for ESPN and then SPEED/CBS coverage of CART & Champ Car races.

Beekhuis moved to the booth as Champ Car television's lead analyst in 2007. In 2008 he was the pit reporter for select IndyCar Series races at Edmonton and Surfers Paradise.

Since 2009, he has worked in varying capacities for NBC Sports Network's (formerly Versus) broadcast of the IndyCar Series, currently serving as a pit reporter alongside Robin Miller, Kevin Lee, and Kelli Stavast.

In 2015, ESPN announced that Beekhuis would return to work for ESPN and ABC and their coverage of five IndyCar races, including the Indianapolis 500. 

His daughter, Jaye, is a published author.

Racing record

American open–wheel racing results
(key)

Indy Lights

CART

Notes

External links
Driver Database Profile

1960 births
American racing drivers
American people of Dutch descent
Atlantic Championship drivers
Champ Car drivers
Indy Lights champions
Indy Lights drivers
SCCA Formula Super Vee drivers
Living people
Motorsport announcers
Sportspeople from Zürich

Walker Racing drivers
Bettenhausen Racing drivers
A. J. Foyt Enterprises drivers